Luck is an unincorporated community in Madison County, North Carolina, United States, located on North Carolina Highway 209, south of Trust. It lies at an elevation of 2556 feet (779 m). The community is part of the Asheville Metropolitan Statistical Area.

References

Unincorporated communities in Madison County, North Carolina
Unincorporated communities in North Carolina
Asheville metropolitan area